Margaret Jean Birtwistle (née Lucas, 26 July 1925 – 18 May 1992) was a British track and field athlete and a British team member in the 1948 London Olympics. In June 1948, she set the British women's record in discus throw.

At the 1948 Olympics she represented Great Britain in both the shot put and the discus.

References

1925 births
1992 deaths
British female shot putters
British female discus throwers
Olympic athletes of Great Britain
Athletes (track and field) at the 1948 Summer Olympics